Basti Nari is a town of Bahawalpur District in the Punjab province of eastern Pakistan. Neighbouring settlements include Faqirwali and Khosa.

Populated places in Bahawalpur District